Mollo may refer to:

 Mollo (surname)
 Mollo culture, Andean civilization during the period of AD 1000 to 1500
 Mollo, Indonesia, a region of the Sonbai princely dynasty of West Timor
 Molló, a town and municipality in the comarca of Ripollès in Girona, Catalonia, Spain

See also
 Molo (disambiguation)
 Prats-de-Mollo-la-Preste, commune in the Pyrénées-Orientales department in southern France